Brycheiniog was a small independent petty kingdom in South Wales in the Early Middle Ages. It can also refer to:

Places
Fan Brycheiniog, highest peak in the Black Mountain region of the Brecon Beacons National Park in South Wales 
Theatr Brycheiniog theatre in Brecon 
People
Gwynfardd Brycheiniog (fl. c. 1170-80), Welsh poet
Brychan (or Brychan Brycheiniog), legendary 5th-century king of Brycheiniog 
Other
Brycheiniog (magazine), journal founded in 1955 and published by the Brecknock Society and Museum Friends